Ismail Ibn Ibrahim (756 – 810) was most notable for being the father of Imam Bukhari. Ismail ibn Ibrahim died in 810, when Imam Bukhari was only an infant, not yet 1 year old.

Biography

Ancestry
Ismail's ancestry can be traced to a farmer named Bardizbah who lived in the vicinity of Bukhara. Bardizbah's had a son named al-Mugheerah who accepted Islam.

Mugheerah eventually had a son named Ibraaheem, the father of Ismail Ibn Ibrahim.

Life
Ismail Ibn Ibrahim became a known scholar of Hadith, praised by Sunni Muslims as a  man of great piety and sound reputation. Scrupulous in his habits, he is said to have mentioned on his deathbed that in all he possessed there was not a penny which had not been earned by his own honest labour.

Ismael also married and had two sons, Ahmad and Muhammad. Muhammad would later be known as Imam Bukhari, the most prominent Sunni hadith collector.

Death
When Imam Bukhari was only an infant, Ismail died at the age of 54. He left a considerable fortune to his widow and  two sons.

References

fatwa-online.com

756 births
810 deaths
Hadith scholars
8th-century Iranian people
8th-century Muslim scholars of Islam
8th-century people from the Abbasid Caliphate
9th-century Muslim scholars of Islam